AKAM or Akam may refer to:

Akam (film), a 2011 Indian Malayalam psychological thriller film
Akam (poetry)
Akam (surname)
Aga Khan Agency for Microfinance, a Swiss not-for-profit agency
Akamai Technologies, which trades on the NASDAQ stock exchange under the symbol "AKAM"
Akam (wrestler), ring name of professional wrestler Sunny Dhinsa